André Saltvold Danielsen (born 20 January 1985) is a Norwegian former footballer who played as a right-back or central midfielder.

Club career
Born in Stavanger, Danielsen started his career with Stavanger IF before joining Viking in 2003. In the fall of 2005 he was loaned out to Bryne. Danielsen is the player with the most appearances for Viking of all time with a total of 553 appearances throughout 17 seasons at the club. This number includes league matches, cup matches, European matches and friendly matches. On 28 October 2019, he announced that he would retire from football after the 2019 season. The same day, he revealed that he would continue to be involved with Viking as a coach for the academy at the club. The 2019 season ended with victory in the 2019 Norwegian Cup Final. Danielsen did not make the squad, but he still received a winner's medal.

International career
Danielsen represented Norwegian national youth teams at under-18, under-19 and under-21 level. He made his senior debut for Norway in a friendly match against Russia on 31 May 2014. In August 2014, he made his second and last international appearance.

Career statistics

Honours 
Viking
 Norwegian First Division: 2018
 Norwegian Football Cup: 2019

References

External links 
 Profile for Viking FK

1985 births
Living people
Sportspeople from Stavanger
Norwegian footballers
Eliteserien players
Norwegian First Division players
Stavanger IF players
Viking FK players
Bryne FK players
Association football midfielders
Norway youth international footballers
Norway under-21 international footballers
Norway international footballers